Greg Holmes (born August 29, 1963) is a former professional tennis player from the United States. He won one doubles title on the ATP Tour and reached his career-high singles ranking of World No. 22 in February 1985.

Holmes won the 1983 NCAA Men's Tennis Championship, playing for the University of Utah.

In 1989, Holmes defeated Todd Witsken 5–7, 6–4, 7–6(5), 4–6, 14–12 in the second round at Wimbledon, a match that was the longest men's singles match at Wimbledon timed at 5 hours 28 minutes until the epic Isner–Mahut match in 2010. During his seven-year career he twice beat Jimmy Connors and had wins over Andre Agassi, Aaron Krickstein, and Tim Mayotte.

Grand Prix career finals

Doubles: 1 (1–0)

References

External links
 
 

1963 births
Living people
American male tennis players
People from Covina, California
Tennis people from California
Tennis players at the 1983 Pan American Games
Pan American Games medalists in tennis
Pan American Games gold medalists for the United States
Pan American Games bronze medalists for the United States
Utah Utes men's tennis players